In Peru, the people directly elect a head of state (the president) as well as a legislature. The president is elected by the people for a five-year term. The unicameral Congress (Congreso) has 130 members, also elected for a five-year term by proportional representation. 
Peru has a multi-party system, which effectively bars one party from becoming the sole influence in a decision-making process. As such, parties must work with one another to form coalition governments.
The whole election process is held by the National Jury of Elections and the National Office of Electoral Processes. Peru has compulsory voting.

Schedule

Election

Inauguration

Latest elections

Presidential election

Parliamentary election

Laws
 Sale of alcohol and carrying firearms (except for Members of the Armed Forces and the National Police) are forbidden during an election.
 Political gatherings are forbidden, while public gatherings of any sort are prohibited during voting hours, including religious liturgies and entertainment shows. Clergy of any religion can not participate in their distinctive garments or habits.

See also
 National Jury of Elections
 National Office of Electoral Processes
 Electoral calendar
 Electoral system

References

External links
Adam Carr's Election Archive